This is a list of events that happened in 2009 in Mexico. The article also lists the most important political leaders during the year at both federal and state levels.

Incumbents

Federal government 
 President: Felipe Calderón 

 Interior Secretary (SEGOB): Fernando Gómez Mont
 Secretary of Foreign Affairs (SRE): Patricia Espinosa
 Communications Secretary (SCT)
Luis Téllez, until March 3
Juan Molinar Horcasitas, starting March 3
 Education Secretary (SEP)
Josefina Vázquez Mota, until April 4
Alonso Lujambio, starting April 6
 Secretary of Defense (SEDENA): Guillermo Galván Galván
 Secretary of Navy (SEMAR): Mariano Francisco Saynez Mendoza
 Secretary of Labor and Social Welfare (STPS): Javier Lozano Alarcón
 Secretary of Welfare (SEDESOL) 
Ernesto Cordero Arroyo, until December 9
Heriberto Félix Guerra, starting December 9
 Tourism Secretary (SECTUR): Rodolfo Elizondo Torres
 Secretary of the Environment (SEMARNAT): Juan Rafael Elvira Quesada
 Secretary of Health (SALUD): José Ángel Córdova
Secretary of Public Security (SSP): Genaro García Luna
Secretary of Finance and Public Credit (SHCP)
Agustín Carstens, until December 9
Ernesto Cordero Arroyo, starting December 9
Secretariat of Energy (Mexico) (SENER): Georgina Yamilet Kessel Martínez, starting December 1
Secretary of Agriculture (SAGARPA)
Alberto Cárdenas, until September 7
Francisco Javier Mayorga Castañeda, starting September 7
Secretary of Public Function (FUNCIÓN PÚBLICA): Salvador Vega Casillas
Secretary of Agrarian Reform (SRA): Germán Martínez
Secretary of Economy (SE): Gerardo Ruiz Mateos
Attorney General of Mexico (PRG)
Eduardo Medina-Mora Icaza, until September 7
Arturo Chávez Chávez, starting September 24

Supreme Court

 President of the Supreme Court: Guillermo Iberio Ortiz Mayagoitia

Governors 

 Aguascalientes: Luis Armando Reynoso, (National Action Party, PAN)
 Baja California: José Guadalupe Osuna Millán, (PAN)
Baja California Sur: Narciso Agúndez Montaño (Party of the Democratic Revolution, PRD)
 Campeche 
Jorge Carlos Hurtado Valdez, (Institutional Revolutionary Party, PRI), until September 15.
Fernando Ortega Bernés, (PRI), starting September 16
 Chiapas: Juan Sabines Guerrero, (Coalition for the Good of All)
 Chihuahua: José Reyes Baeza Terrazas (Institutional Revolutionary Party, PRI)
 Coahuila: Humberto Moreira Valdés, (Institutional Revolutionary Party PRI)
 Colima: 
 Silverio Cavazos, (Institutional Revolutionary Party, PRI), until 1 November
 Mario Anguiano Moreno, (Institutional Revolutionary Party, PRI) from 1 November
 Durango: Ismael Hernández, (Institutional Revolutionary Party PRI)
 Guanajuato: Juan Manuel Oliva, (National Action Party, PAN)
 Guerrero: René Juárez Cisneros, (Institutional Revolutionary Party PRI)
 Hidalgo: Miguel Ángel Osorio Chong, (Institutional Revolutionary Party PRI)
 Jalisco: Emilio González Márquez, (Institutional Revolutionary Party PRI)
 State of Mexico: Enrique Pena Nieto, (Institutional Revolutionary Party PRI)
 Michoacán: Lázaro Cárdenas Batel, (Party of the Democratic Revolution (PRD) (until 15 February); Leonel Godoy Rangel (Party of the Democratic Revolution (PRD) (from 15 February)
 Morelos: Marco Antonio Adame (PAN).
 Nayarit: Ney González Sánchez
 Nuevo León:
 José Natividad González Parás, (Institutional Revolutionary Party, PRI), until 3 October
 Rodrigo Medina de la Cruz, (Institutional Revolutionary Party, PRI), from 3 October
 Oaxaca: Ulises Ruiz Ortiz, (Institutional Revolutionary Party PRI)
 Puebla: Mario Marín Torres, (Institutional Revolutionary Party PRI)
 Querétaro: Francisco Garrido Patrón (National Action Party, PAN)
 Quintana Roo: Félix González Canto, (Institutional Revolutionary Party PRI)
 San Luis Potosí: 
 Jesús Marcelo de los Santos Fraga, (Institutional Revolutionary Party, PRI), until 25 September
 Fernando Toranzo Fernández, Fernando Toranzo Fernández, (Institutional Revolutionary Party, PRI), from 25 September
 Sinaloa: Jesús Aguilar Padilla, (Institutional Revolutionary Party, PRI)
 Sonora: 
 Eduardo Bours, (Institutional Revolutionary Party, PRI), until 12 September
 Guillermo Padrés Elías, (National Action Party, PAN), from 12 September
 Tabasco: Andrés Rafael Granier Melo, (Institutional Revolutionary Party PRI)
 Tamaulipas: Eugenio Hernández Flores, (Institutional Revolutionary Party PRI)	
 Tlaxcala: Héctor Ortiz Ortiz (National Action Party, PAN)
 Veracruz: Fidel Herrera Beltrán (Institutional Revolutionary Party PRI)	
 Yucatán: Ivonne Ortega Pacheco (Institutional Revolutionary Party PRI)	
 Zacatecas: Amalia García (Party of the Democratic Revolution PRD)
Head of Government of the Federal District: Marcelo Ebrard (PRD)

Events 

January– A Swine flu pandemic occur right after the U.S. first case of the Flu.
 February 11 – Mexico's National Institute of Anthropology and History announces the discovery of a 16th-century mass grave at the Tlatelolco archaeological site in Mexico City.
 March 4 – 2009 Mexico prison riot: A riot at a prison near Ciudad Juárez, Mexico, kills at least 20 inmates and injures seven others.
 March 17 – At least 11 people are killed and four injured in a bus accident outside Saltillo, Coahuila, Mexico.
 April 10 – Mexico City closes freshwater supplies to 5,000,000 people for 36 hours to combat shortages.
 April 19 – Eight corrections officers are killed in an ambush during a prisoner transfer in Nayarit, Mexico.
 April 25 – Mexico's government declares a state of emergency to combat the outbreak of swine influenza.
 April 27 – 2009 Guerrero earthquake: A 5.6-magnitude earthquake strikes near Chilpancingo, Guerrero, Mexico.
 May 16 – The Gulf drug cartel liberates 59 inmates from a prison in Zacatecas, Mexico.
 May 22 – A 5.7-magnitude earthquake strikes Chiautla de Tapia, Puebla, Mexico.
 June 6 – 2009 Hermosillo daycare center fire: a fire at a day-care center kills at least 40 people in Hermosillo, Mexico.
 July 3 – A 6.0 magnitude earthquake centred in the Sea of Cortez shakes western Mexico.
 July 5 – Mexico holds its legislative election.
 August 3 – Several earthquakes, including one of 6.9 magnitude, hit northwestern Mexico.
 August 7 – 2009 Guanajuato and Hidalgo shootings: Shootouts leave at least 11 dead in the escalating violence since Mexico's continuing national crackdown on the illegal drug trade.
August 4 – President Felipe Calderon receives Honduras President Manuel Zelaya in Los Pinos after a coup d'etat.
 August 15 – A prison riot in the Mexican state of Durango leaves at least 19 people dead and 20 injured.
 August 21 – Mexico decriminalises the use of small amounts of marijuana, cocaine, heroin and other drugs for "personal use".
 September 9 – Aeroméxico Flight 576, a Boeing 737 carrying 104 people, is hijacked shortly after take-off from Cancún, and forced to land at Mexico City International Airport.
 September 16 – Gunmen kill 10 people at a drug rehabilitation clinic in Mexico.
 December 16 – Mexican drug lord Arturo Beltrán Leyva, leader of the Beltrán-Leyva Cartel, is killed by personnel of the Mexican Navy during a shootout in Cuernavaca, Morelos.
 December 21 – Mexico City's Legislative Assembly legalizes same-sex marriage and LGBT adoption.
 December 25 – The death by gunshot wound of Expresiones de Tulum journalist Alberto Velázquez, the 12th journalist to be killed in Mexico in 2009, is announced.

Awards

	
Belisario Domínguez Medal of Honor	– Javier Barros Sierra (post mortem)
Order of the Aztec Eagle	
National Prize for Arts and Sciences	
National Public Administration Prize	
Ohtli Award
 Viola Casares
 Jimmie V. Reyna
 Esperanza Andrade
 Gil Cedillo
 Gloria Molina
 Enrique Morones
 Janet Murguía

Popular culture

Sports 

 2009 Primera División de México Clausura
 2009 Primera División de México Apertura 
 2009 InterLiga
 2009 CONCACAF Champions League Finals 
 2009 CONCACAF U-17 Championship 
 2009 CONCACAF Beach Soccer Championship 
 Homenaje a Dos Leyendas (2009) 
 2009 FIA WTCC Race of Mexico 
 2009 LATAM Challenge Series season 
 2009 NASCAR Corona Series season 
 2009 NASCAR Mini Stock Series season 
 2009 Chihuahua Express 
 2009 Carrera Panamericana 
 2009 International Rally of Nations 
 2009 NORCECA Beach Volleyball Circuit (Manzanillo)
 2009 NORCECA Beach Volleyball Circuit (Puerto Vallarta) 
 2009 NORCECA Beach Volleyball Circuit (Tijuana) 
 2009 Mexican Figure Skating Championships 
 2009 FIVB Women's Junior World Championship
 Mexico at the 2009 World Championships in Athletics
 2009 Caribbean Series

Music 
 List of number-one albums of 2009 (Mexico)

Film 

 All inclusive
 Amar
 Amar a morir
 Cabeza de Buda
 Otra película de huevos y un pollo
 Tlatelolco: México 68
 Recién Cazado
 Sólo quiero caminar
 Secretos de familia
 Nikté

Literature

TV

Telenovelas 

 Un gancho al corazón
 Mañana es para siempre
 Atrévete a soñar
 Verano de amor
 Mi pecado
 Camaleones
 Hasta que el dinero nos separe
 Sortilegio
 Alma de Hierro
 Pasión Morena
 Eternamente tuya
 Pobre diabla
 Los exitosos Pérez
 Corazón salvaje
 Mujer comprada

Notable deaths 

 January 11 – Ricardo Martínez de Hoyos, 90, Mexican painter, pneumonia.
 January 14 – Ricardo Montalbán, 88, Mexican-born American actor (Fantasy Island, Star Trek II: The Wrath of Khan), heart failure.
February 6 – Claudio Reyes Núñez, politician , president of Otáez Municipality, Durango; murdered.
 February 7 – Jorge Reyes, 56, Mexican musician (Chac Mool), heart attack.
 February 22 – Francisco Javier Rodríguez Aceves, politician , former president of Petatlán (municipality), Guerrero: murdered.
 February 24 – Octavio Manuel Carrillo Castellanos, politician , municipal president of Vista Hermosa, Michoacán; murdered.
 March 3 – Luis Mena Arroyo, 88, Mexican prelate, Auxiliary Bishop of Mexico.
March 7 – |Gonzalo Paz Torres||N/A||Chief of city council||7 March 2009||Tancítaro, Michoacán||
March 14 – Dimas Arzeta Cisneros, politician , former president of Tecpán de Galeana, Guerrero; murdered.
 March 18 – Luis Rojas Mena, 91, Mexican Roman Catholic prelate, Bishop of Culiacán (1969–1993).
 March 22 – Abismo Negro, 37, Mexican lucha libre professional wrestler, drowned.
 March 23 – Raúl Macías, 74, Mexican boxer, cancer.
 March 26 – Griselda Álvarez, 95, Mexican politician and writer, Governor of Colima (1979–1985), natural causes.
 April 3 – Nicolás León Hernández, politician , former municipal president of Isla del Cayacal, Michoacán; murdered.
April 7 – Gustavo Bucio Rodríguez, politician , candidate for Deputy in Michoacán; murdered.
April 20 – Alfonso Rivera Cruz, municipal president pro tempore of Zapotitlán Tablas (municipality), Guerrero; murdered.
 April 23 – Felipe Solís Olguín, 64, Mexican archaeologist, curator of the National Anthropology Museum, cardiac arrest.
 April 30 – Amparo Arozamena, 92, Mexican actress, heart attack.
 May 5 – Manuel Capetillo, bullfighter, singer, and actor; respiratory illness (b. 1926)
 May 5 – Benjamín Flores, 24, Mexican boxer, brain injury during a match.
June 2 – Luis Carlos Ramírez López, politician , president of Ocampo Municipality; murdered.
June 11 – Efraín Gutiérrez Arcos, politician , former municipal president of Santa Ana Maya, Michoacán; murdered.
June 23 — Manuel Saval, 53, actor (b. 1956)
July 14
Héctor Manuel Meixueiro Muñoz, politician , president of Namiquipa Municipality, Chihuahua; murdered.
Ismael Rivera, politician, treasurer of the municipality of Namiquipa, Chihuahua; murdered.
 July 19 – Guillermo Schulenburg, 93, Mexican Abbot of the Basilica of Our Lady of Guadalupe (1963–1996), natural causes.
 July 22 – Marco Antonio Nazareth, 23, Mexican boxer, cerebral hemorrhage.
 August 20
Carlos González Nova, 92, Mexican businessman, founder of Comercial Mexicana supermarket chain.
Armando Chavarría Barrera, politician , Deputy from Chilpancingo, Guerrero; murdered.
 August 29 – Yolanda Varela, 79, Mexican film actress, natural causes.
 September 6 – Jose Francisco Fuentes, 43, politician; shot.
October 9 – Estanislao García Santelis, politician, municipal president of Puerto Palomas, Chihuahua; murdered.
October 16 – José Sánchez Chávez, politician , former municipal president of Tiquicheo, Michoacán; murdered.
 October 25 – Lázaro Pérez Jiménez, 66, Mexican Roman Catholic Bishop of Celaya.
 November 6 – Manuel Arvizu, 90, Mexican Roman Catholic Bishop of Jesús María del Nayar.
 November 7 – Bernardo Garza Sada, 79, Mexican businessman, founder of ALFA.
 November 16 – Antonio de Nigris, 31, Mexican football player, heart failure.
 November 28 – Joaquín Vargas Gómez, 84, Mexican media owner, founder of MVS Comunicaciones, natural causes.
December 4: Leticia Palma (Zoyla Gloria Ruiz Moscoso), 82, actress (En la palma de tu mano), (b. 1926)
 December 7 – Lorenzo Ochoa Salas, Mexican archeologist.
 December 16 – Arturo Beltrán Leyva, 48, Mexican drug lord, shot.

References

External links